OnStage was a Canadian radio program, which aired Sunday afternoons on CBC Radio 2 and Sunday evenings on CBC Radio One. Hosted by Shelley Solmes, the program aired classical and jazz concert performances by Canadian and international artists.

CBC Radio One programs
CBC Music programs
Canadian classical music radio programs